Olga Givernet (born 17 October 1981) is a French politician of La République En Marche! (LREM) who has been serving as a member of the French National Assembly since the 2017 elections, representing the department of Ain.

Education and early career
Givernet completed her secondary studies in Yvelines. At age 23, she obtained an engineer's degree in electronics and computer science for embedded systems, and a master's degree.

In 2015, Givernet decided with her husband to settle in Auckland where she found a job as an avionics engineer, then project manager at the design office of Air New Zealand. After spending three years in New Zealand, she returned to France in 2007 and settled with her husband in Ain to work in jet maintenance centres at Geneva Airport.

Political career

Career in local politics
In 2013, Givernet joined the Democratic Movement (MoDem). In March 2014, she was elected city councilor of Saint-Genis-Pouilly on the list of the outgoing mayor, Hubert Bertrand (DVG). She becomes in this capacity councilor of the community of communes of the Country of Gex.

In autumn 2015 Givernet decided to leave MoDem when the party decided to ally with the Republicans led by Laurent Wauquiez, whose ideas she did not share, for the regional elections in Auvergne-Rhône-Alpes in December 2015. She was elected on 4th position on the union list of the left Ain, led by Jean-Jack Queyranne.

Due to the limitation of the plurality of the mandates, Givernet resigned from her position of municipal councilor of Saint-Genis-Pouilly on 18 July 2017.

Member of the French National Assembly
In the spring of 2016, Givernet ran for the by-election in the 3rd constituency of Ain, prompted by the resignation of incumbent Etienne Blanc. Without any label, she presented herself as "democrat", claiming to be centrist and declaring herself to be recognized by Emmanuel Macron. She was defeated in the first round on 13 June 2016 with a score of 10.05% of the votes cast.

Without a political label, Givernet joined the summer 2016 movement En Marche! created by Emmanuel Macron, of which she became the referent in the Ain. She was chosen in May 2017 as the party's candidate in the 3rd constituency of Ain for the 2017 parliamentary elections. After obtaining in the first round 45.30% of the votes cast, she was elected in the second round with 61.86% of the votes cast against the outgoing Stéphanie Pernod-Beaudon.

In parliament, Givernet serves on the Committee on Foreign Affairs, one of the eight standing committees. She also joined the Public Policy Evaluation and Oversight Committee. In addition to her committee assignments, she is part of the French-Swiss Parliamentary Friendship Group.

In July 2019, Givernet challenged incumbent chairman Gilles Le Gendre for the leadership of the LREM parliamentary group; Le Gendre was subsequently re-elected in the first round, with Givernet receiving the third highest number of votes after Florent Boudié.

She was re-elected in the 2022 French legislative election.

Political positions
In May 2018, Givernet co-sponsored an initiative in favour of a bioethics law extending to gay and single women free access to fertility treatments such as in vitro fertilisation (IVF) under France's national health insurance; it was one of the campaign promises of President Emmanuel Macron and marked the first major social reform of his five-year term.

In July 2019, Givernet voted in favor of the French ratification of the European Union's Comprehensive Economic and Trade Agreement (CETA) with Canada.

References

1981 births
Living people
French women engineers
French aerospace engineers
People from Saint-Germain-en-Laye
Women members of the National Assembly (France)
La République En Marche! politicians
21st-century French women politicians
Deputies for Ain (French Fifth Republic)
Regional councillors of Auvergne-Rhône-Alpes
Politicians from Auvergne-Rhône-Alpes
Deputies of the 15th National Assembly of the French Fifth Republic
Deputies of the 16th National Assembly of the French Fifth Republic